Martin Gründler (4 December 1918 in Oberroßbach – 20 October 2004) was a German voice teacher and university lecturer.

Life and career 
From 1957, Gründler was professor of opera singing at the Frankfurt University of Music and Performing Arts. Information about his students can be found in Karl-Josef Kutsch's and Leo Riemens' Großes Sängerlexikon.

Gründler was awarded honorary senator dignity at his university in 2003.

References 

1918 births
2004 deaths
People from Rhineland-Palatinate
Voice teachers
Academic staff of the Frankfurt University of Music and Performing Arts